Teucridium is a genus of flowering plant in the family Lamiaceae, first described as a genus in 1853. It contains only one known species, Teucridium parvifolium, endemic to New Zealand.

References

External links
 Flora of New Zealand
 New Zealand Plant Photos
 New Zealand Plant Conservation Network
 Plant Lust, Cistus Nursery, Portland Oregon USA

Lamiaceae
Endemic flora of New Zealand
Monotypic Lamiaceae genera